A register office or The General Register Office, much more commonly but erroneously registry office (except in official use), is a British government office where births, deaths, marriages, civil partnership, stillbirths and adoptions in England, Wales and Northern Ireland are registered. It is the licensed local of civil registry.

In Scotland, The General Register Office for Scotland (GROS) was in service until 2011, when this department was transferred to National Records of Scotland.

England and Wales
In England and Wales, register offices record births, marriages, deaths, civil partnership, stillbirths and  adoptions. Set up by Act of Parliament in 1837, the statutory registration service is overseen by the Registrar General as part of the General Register Office, part of the Home Office Identity and Passport Service but provided locally by local authorities.

Similar rules regarding registration have applied in Scotland since 1855 and in Northern Ireland since 1845 for non-Catholic marriages and 1864 for births, deaths and all marriages.

A register office is the office of the superintendent registrar of the district, in whose custody are all the registers dating back to 1837. The superintendent registrar is also responsible for conducting the legal preliminaries to marriage and conducting civil partnership ceremonies.

Registrations are carried out by a registrar and each registration district will have one or more registrars and each may be responsible for a particular sub-district.

Since 1994, the range of services offered by register offices has expanded so that they may now provide additional celebratory services including statutory citizenship and civil partnership ceremonies and non-statutory ceremonies such as naming and renewal of vows. All civil ceremonies may also take place in local approved premises, including hotels and public buildings.

On 1 December 2007, all registrars and superintendent registrars in England and Wales became employees of the local authorities providing the registration service, having been statutory officers with no legal employment status. This came about as a result of the Statistics and Registration Service Act 2007 following decades of campaigning by the trade unions that represented registration officers in England and Wales, the Society of Registration Officers and UNISON.

Ireland
In Ireland, legislation came into force in 1845 which provided for the registration of civil marriages and for the regulation of all non-Catholic marriages. Roman Catholic marriages were reported to the relevant superintendent registrar.

Equivalents outside the UK

There is no direct equivalent in the USA, but the bureaus of vital statistics perform some similar tasks. In Italy the function is fulfilled by the Ufficio di Stato Civile and in Germany by the Standesamt.

See also
 Onomastics
 Name change
 Pseudonym

References

External links
 General Register Office at Direct.gov (England and Wales)
 Online Certificate Ordering (England and Wales)
 General Register Office for Scotland
 General Register Office Northern Ireland
  Register a Birth in United Kingdom

United Kingdom
Local government in the United Kingdom
Civil Registration and Vital Statistic